Rob Dames (born June 13, 1944) is an American writer, director and producer from St. Louis, Missouri. He is married to Anne-Françoise Bourdeaud and has a daughter named Damien.

Productions
He started his career in the film industry in 1977, with credits including The Love Boat, Benson, Marblehead Manor and Full House. He was involved in the rewriting of The Flintstones and Casper for Amblin Entertainment, as well as Snow Dogs for Disney. In Europe, he provided consulting services for Heil Honey I'm Home! and Ritas Welt. He has published one novel: One Ball Each.

External links

Living people
American film directors
American television directors
Film producers from Missouri
American television producers
Writers from St. Louis
1944 births